Hangtou is a town in Jiande, Zhejiang province, China. , it administers Hangtou Residential Community and the following 18 villages:
Hangtou Village
Luoyuan Village
Pengjia Village
Tianfan Village
Dong Village
Hangjing Village
Huangmugang Village
Xiyan Village
Hangchuan Village
Wulong Village
Qianyuan Village
Dadiankou Village
Shimuling Village
Yutang Village
Shiping Village
Lingqi Village
Nanping Village
Caoyuan Village

References

Towns of Zhejiang
Jiande